Maus Frères SA (French for "Maus Brothers") is a Swiss holding company based in Geneva that owns the Lacoste brand, department stores and other businesses.

It was founded in 1902 by wholesalers Ernest and Henri Maus and retailer Léon Nordmann.  Its oldest business remains the Manor department store chain, which gets its name from founders' names "Maus" and "Nordmann".  Until the early 1990s, Maus also owned Printemps in France and the Bergner's, Carson Pirie Scott, and Boston Store department store chains in the Midwestern United States. 

Maus Frères announced the sale of the DIY brand Jumbo to the Coop group in April 2021.

Holdings
Maus Frères holdings as of 2021

Switzerland
 Manor, the original Maus Frères department store business
 Manor Foods, a supermarket chain
 Manora Restaurants

International
 Lacoste
 Aigle
 Gant
 The Kooples
 Tecnifibre

References

External links
 Maus Frères SA - official corporate site

Retail companies established in 1902
Retail companies of Switzerland